Charles Green (1901–1972) was an English archaeologist noted for his excavations in East Anglia, and his work on the Sutton Hoo ship-burial. His "signal achievements" were his East Anglian excavations, including four years spent by Caister-on-Sea and Burgh Castle, and several weeks in 1961 as Director of excavations at Walsingham Priory. Green additionally brought his "long experience of boat-handling" to bear in writing his 1963 book, Sutton Hoo: The Excavation of a Royal Ship-Burial, a major work that combined a popular account of the Anglo-Saxon burial with Green's contributions about ship-construction and seafaring.

Green began his career in archaeology as an assistant at the Salford Royal Museum, and in 1932 was named curator of The Museum of Gloucester. Much of his East Anglian work was carried out in the 1950s and 1960s on behalf of the Ministry of Works. Green was also a member of the  National Executive of the Council for British Archaeology, a one time President of the Norfolk Research Committee, and, at his death, the President of the Great Yarmouth Archaeological Society and Vice-President of the Norfolk and Norwich Archaeological Society.

Career 
Charles Green was born in Lancaster, England, in 1901. He began his archaeological career as an assistant at the Royal Museum in Salford, Greater Manchester, and in 1932 he was appointed curator of The Museum of Gloucester. There, he studied the prehistory of Gloucestershire, undertaking a study of Roman Gloucester and publishing several papers, including an important 1949 note on the burials found in Birdlip. The Royal Air Force took Green under its wing during World War II; he served in the photographic and intelligence branches, befitting his archaeological interest in air photography.

During the 1950s, Green carried out many excavations for the Ministry of Works, difficult work for an understaffed department. In 1951, he arrived in East Anglia, which would become the site of his "signal achievements", to excavate the Roman town at Caister-on-Sea, close to Great Yarmouth and across from Burgh Castle. Green spent four years continuously excavating there, from the summer of 1951 to January 1955, chronicling the rise and fall of the town. This work gave him experience with the fluctuations of the North Sea, leading to his contribution to the 1960 book The Making of the Broads. From 1958 to 1960, also for the Ministry of Works, Green excavated a nearly plough-destroyed barrow cemetery in Shrewton, a village near Stonehenge. This led to a paper read to the Prehistoric Society in 1960, and a posthumous publication in 1984.

Green continued excavations in East Anglia in the 1960s, including several weeks spent at Walsingham Priory; an article on the excavations was published in 1968. In this decade he also published at least four papers in Norfolk Archaeology. He was credited with "a far-seeing interdisciplinary approach" for "A Human Skull from Runham, Norfolk" (1961) and "Broadland Fords and Causeways" (1961), "historical topography" in "The Lost Vill of Ness" (1969), and "emergent industrial archaeological considerations" for the "entrancing" "Herring-Nets and Beatsters" (1969).

Sutton Hoo 
In 1963 Green published Sutton Hoo: The Excavation of a Royal Ship-Burial. It is considered a major work about the Sutton Hoo ship-burial, a high-status grave from the seventh century. The book benefited from Green's considerable experience in boat-handling along Western Ireland and the entirety of the North Sea, giving him a realistic perspective on the capabilities of Anglo-Saxon ships, and was said to reflect "adventurous, though scientific, sea-faring".

Sutton Hoo: The Excavation of a Royal Ship-Burial was reviewed as a popular account of the excavation, offering "a convenient peg on which to hang the more original chapters of the book". The first half of the work retold the story, published elsewhere and in more detail, of the burial; as the archaeologist Brian Hope-Taylor noted, "it is as though the British Museum's Provisional Guide, which most of us have known since it was so-thick, has suddenly filled out on reaching its middle teens". Green "claim[ed] no originality for these chapters of his book"; according to another reviewer, "[t]here is no originality in his conclusions that the burial took place in the third quarter of the seventh century, and that the person it commemorates was a prominent member, indeed almost certainly a king, of the East Anglian royal family."

Green's original contribution came in the second half of the book, where he discussed ship-construction from the fall of the Roman Empire to the Viking Age, and the problems of navigating the North Sea in keelless boats such as the Sutton Hoo ship. He concluded that the Sutton Hoo ship was not as well constructed as were later Viking ships, could not have supported a sail, and could not have safely withstood open sailing in the North Sea. Travel from East Anglia to Schleswig, near modern day Denmark, would have required hugging the coastline, he suggested, resulting in a trip that could have taken up to two months.

Green revisited the topic of sea-travel in his later years. Shortly before his 1972 death, he had been undertaking a work on early sea-travel, especially the raids along the coasts of Roman Britain made by the Picts in their curraghs.

Organizations 
Green was made a member of the Norfolk and Norwich Naturalists' Society in 1953. Starting in 1964, he was the Vice-President of the Norfolk and Norwich Archaeological Society. He was formerly the President of the Norfolk Research Committee, and President of the Great Yarmouth Archaeological Society; he was also an early member of the National Executive of the Council for British Archaeology, helping guide it in its early years.

Personal life 
Green had a daughter, Barbara Green. She was also an archaeologist, and served as keeper of archaeology at Norwich Castle from 1963 until 1992. Charles Green was living in Ormesby St Margaret in Norfolk in 1971, and died the following year.

Publications

References

Bibliography 
  
 Also published online with photograph.
  
  
  
  
  
  
  
  
  
  
  
  

20th-century English historians
1901 births
1972 deaths
English archaeologists
English curators
English naval historians
People from Lancaster, Lancashire
Royal Air Force personnel of World War II